Guiaro is a department or commune of Nahouri Province in southeastern Burkina Faso. Its capital is the town of Guiaro.

References

Departments of Burkina Faso
Nahouri Province